The Society of Strip Illustration (SSI), later known as the Comics Creators Guild, was a British network for all those involved in any stage of the creative process of comics production. The SSI, which was co-founded in 1977 by Denis Gifford, met monthly in London, published a newsletter, and distributed annual awards for achievement in the field. Despite the organization's name, most members were comic book creators, as opposed to those of comic strips like those found in The Beano and The Dandy.

SSI members included Brian Bolland, Dave Gibbons, John Bolton, Kevin O'Neill, Paul Neary, Jim Baikie, Arthur Ranson, Tony Weare, Keith Watson, Alan Davis, Mark Farmer, Alan Grant, Bryan Talbot, David Lloyd, Alan Moore, Neil Gaiman, Dave McKean, Mark Buckingham, Nicholas Vince, and John Maybury. For a while in the 1970s, the SSI met at the London Sketch Club in Dilke Street, Chelsea.

History 
In November 1980, the SSI hosted a conference which resulted in the publication of Strips '80, an introduction to the Society and a directory of its members.

According to Brian Bolland, in the early 1980s, scouts from DC Comics came to SSI meetings to recruit British creators to work on DC titles, leading to the so-called British Invasion.

The 1981 Society of Strip Illustration Awards were distributed on Saturday, October 31, at Comicon '81, held at the Regent Centre Hotel, London.

In October 1982, the SSI sponsored a "Teach-In and Work-In" at the Westminster Comic Mart, with a number of creators from 2000 AD and Warrior talking about and presenting their work. David Lloyd was chairman of the SSI, and editor of the newsletter,
at this time. A later chairman was Mark Buckingham.

The SSI became the Comics Creators Guild in 1992; Nicholas Vince was secretary and then chairman of the Guild from 1992 to 1993. The Guild's newsletter became known as Comics Forum; it was published quarterly from 1992 to 2004, and then annually until  2008. 

The Guild appears to have dissolved some time after 2008.

Awards 
The SSI distributed awards from 1977 until at least 1989; in 1988 the awards were renamed The Mekon Award (in honor of The Mekon of Mekonta, the arch-enemy of the British comic book hero Dan Dare). When the SSI became the Comics Creators Guild in 1992, the award name was again changed, this time to the Comics Creators Guild Award.

 1977
 Best Newcomer — Brian Bolland

 1978
 Cartoonist of the Year — Ken Reid
 Humorous Script Writer — Ken Reid

 1982 
 The Frank Bellamy Award for Lifetime Achievement — Dez Skinn
 Best Writer — Alan Moore
 Humorous Cartoonist of the Year — Hunt Emerson

 1983 
 Best Writer — Alan Moore
 Best Humour Strip — Danger Mouse, by Arthur Ranson
 Best British Adventure Artist — Jim Baikie

 1988
 The Mekon Award for Best British Work — Violent Cases (Titan Books), by Neil Gaiman and Dave McKean

 1989
 The Mekon Award for Best British Work — The Adventures of Luther Arkwright (Valkyrie Press), by Bryan Talbot

 1995
 Comics Creators Guild Award for Best Graphic Album in the UK — Stuck Rubber Baby, by Howard Cruse

See also 
 Association of Illustrators
 British Cartoonists' Association
 The Cartoonists' Club of Great Britain

References

External links 
 Excerpts from the SSI Newsletter of May 1979 (issue #16)
 Excerpts from the SSI Newsletter of May 1981 (#40), featuring a writers round table with Alan Moore, Pat Mills, Steve Moore, Steve Parkhouse, and Angus Allan
 Comics Forum issues at MyComicShop.com

1977 establishments in the United Kingdom
Arts organisations based in the United Kingdom
Mekon Award
Comics-related organizations
Professional associations based in the United Kingdom